Landau is a large lunar impact crater that is located in the northern hemisphere on the far side of the Moon. It was named after physicist Lev Landau. The crater Wegener is attached to the northeastern rim. Attached to the southeastern rim is Frost.

The outer rim of Landau is heavily eroded and modified by subsequent impacts. The most notable of these is Wood, which overlays the northwest rim. Much of the floor is hilly and irregular, with only the northeast quadrant being somewhat level. There are multiple small craters and craterlets in the floor. The most intact section of the rim is in the southwest, although this is now little more than a low ridge line.

Landau lies at the approximate margin of the Coulomb-Sarton Basin, a 530 km wide impact crater of Pre-Nectarian age.

Satellite craters
By convention these features are identified on lunar maps by placing the letter on the side of the crater midpoint that is closest to Landau.

References

 
 
 
 
 
 
 
 
 
 
 
 

Impact craters on the Moon